
Petru Comarnescu (born 23 November 1905, Iași - d. 27 November 1970, Bucharest) was a Romanian literary and art critic and translator.

Born in Iași into a family that was related to the metropolitan bishop Veniamin Costache, he studied at the University of Bucharest law (degree in 1928), philosophy and philology (degree in 1929) before going in 1931 on a two-year scholarship to the United States of America, where he received a PhD in aesthetics from the University of Southern California, Los Angeles, with a thesis entitled The Nature of Beauty and Its Relation to Goodness (published later in Romanian in 1946 as Kalokagathon).

Together with Mircea Vulcănescu and Alexandru Christian Tell, he started the Criterion association and magazine in 1934.

Before the Second World War he published in several Romanian newspapers, for example Adevărul, Adevărul literar și artistic, Azi, Stânga, Arta, Excelsior, Da și nu, Ulisse and was an editor at Vremea (1931–1936), Rampa (1933–1934), Revista Fundațiilor Regale (from its foundation to 1943). Between 1944 and 1949 he published in Bis, Agora, Timpul, Arcades, Națiunea, Universul.

Between 1949 and 1960 he was not allowed to publish under his own name, due to political reasons. The only exceptions were monographies about painters or sculptors: Octav Băncilă (1954), Abgar Baltazar (1956), Viaţa şi opera lui Rembrandt van Rijn ("The Life And Work of Rembrandt")(1957), Nicolae Grigorescu (1959), Ştefan Luchian (1960).

Later, he would also write about other well-known Romanian visual artists, such as Gheorghe Petrașcu, Theodor Pallady, Nicolae Tonitza, Francisc Șirato, Ion Țuculescu, sometimes even in English The Romanian and the Universal in Brâncuși's Work (1970).

Trying to avoid being marginalized, he compromised with the Communist authorities, such as by joining the Partidul Muncitoresc Român (Romanian Workers' Party, later called Partidul Comunist Român- Romanian Communist Party). In 2014 Comarnescu was found to have been an informant for the Securitate.

Alone or in cooperation with others he translated from English or Russian: D. H. Lawrence, Daniel Defoe, Sir Walter Scott, Mark Twain, Eugene O’Neill, J. B. Priestley, Howard Fast, Leo Tolstoi, Alexander Herzen, Alexander Gorchakov, Gleb Uspensky, Nikolay Chernyshevsky, Sasha Chorny, Ilya Ehrenburg.

He was critically acclaimed by his contemporaries, Camil Petrescu calling him "the leader" of their generation, Barbu Brezianu its "herald", Mircea Eliade its "magus".

Comarnescu was married to Gina Manolescu-Strunga, the daughter of a liberal politician, but she had been in love with N. D. Cocea, a well-known writer and journalist, from the age of 17 (and by whom she would become pregnant after her marriage)
 and as a result they divorced two years later.

He is buried at the Voroneţ Monastery cemetery.

Memberships
 Member of the Romanian Writers' Association (Societatea Scriitorilor Români)(1945), and later of The Romanian Writers' Union (Uniunea Scriitorilor din R.S.R).
 Member of the Fine Arts Association of Romania (U.A.P.), Critics section. After facing opposition by some of the members he was finally accepted, being supported by Alexandru Rosetti, Tudor Vianu, Ion Frunzetti and Vlaicu Bârna.

Awards and prizes
Meritul Cultural clasa I (1946)
Meritul Cultural în rang de Cavaler, clasa a II-a (1947)
Ordinul Cultural în rang de Cavaler, clasa a II-a (1968)
The Fine Arts Association of Romania's Criticism Prize (1965)
Gold Medal of the International Association of Art Critics (AICA), on the occasion of the 16th congress held in Rimini, Italy.

Selected works
Homo Americanus (1933)
Zgârie-norii New York-ului (1933)
America văzută de un tânăr de azi (1934)
Răspântii- forme de viaţă culturală (1936)
Artă şi imagine (1939)
Soluţiile artei în cultura modernă (1943)
Giordano Bruno (1947)
Chipurile şi priveliştile Americii (1940)
America. Lume nouă, viaţă nouă (1947)
Chipurile și priveliștile Europei (posthumously) (1980)Pagini de Jurnal, Editura Noul Orfeu, Bucharest, 2003

Books about him
Monica Ştefan (Grosu), Petru Comarnescu – un neliniştit în secolul său (PhD thesis, published as a monography).

References
Al. Piru, Istoria Literaturii Române'', Ed. Grai si suflet-Cultura nationala, Bucharest, 1994
Article about him in the Romanian newspaper Evenimentul

Romanian literary critics
Romanian art critics
1905 births
1970 deaths
20th-century Romanian LGBT people